Fort McKay 174 is an Indian reserve of the Fort McKay First Nation in Alberta, located within the Regional Municipality of Wood Buffalo.

References

Indian reserves in Alberta